Wang Lang (died AD 24), originally named Wang Chang (王昌), became a leader of one of the revolts that rose up towards the end of the Xin dynasty by pretending to be a son of Emperor Cheng of Han. Originally a native of the Zhao State, he was acclaimed as emperor and managed to briefly establish an independent regime in the area of Hebei.

Life
Wang Lang began his working life as a fortune teller, with expertise in astronomy and calendrics, who determined that Hebei had the qi of a Son of Heaven.

Before Wang Mang established the Xin dynasty in AD 9, there was a man living in Chang'an named Liu Ziyu (刘子輿) who claimed to be the son of Emperor Cheng of Han. When Liu Ziyu was murdered on the orders of the Xin dynasty emperor Wang Mang, Wang Lang took the opportunity to pretend to be the real Liu Ziyu. Liu Lin planned, with the support of the powerful families of Li Yu (李育) and Zhang Can (張参), to declare Wang Lang emperor.

At that time there was a rumour that the Red Eyebrows army was crossing the Yellow River heading north. In the tenth month of AD 23, Gengshi Emperor had ordered General Liu Xiu and acting minister of war to pacify Hebei. Upon visiting the city of Handan, Liu Xiu met with Liu Lin, who suggested opening the dams in order to drown the Hebei Red Eyebrows troops. Liu Xiu declined this option, and moved on north, towards  (真定).

In the twelfth month of the same year, Liu Lin led several hundred horsemen into the city of Handan, and in the early morning arrived at the palace of King Miao of Zhao. Wang Lang was then named emperor. Wang Lang nominated Liu Lin as prime minister, Li Yu Minister of War, and Zhang Can Great General. Wang Lang's army occupied the Ji (冀) and You (幽) counties, and took advantage of the public's positive attitude towards the Han dynasty by claiming that the general  who opposed Wang Mang before the Xin dynasty was established, had not yet died and was in support of them. This gained them much popularity and support amongst the populace. Wang Lang controlled the state of Zhao from its north, and Liaodong peninsula from its eastern end, and offered a price of ten marquise-level bronze vessels for anyone who would bring the severed head of Liu Xiu.

With all the forces now available to Liu Xiu , Wang Lang suffered a series of defeats in Hebei. During the fourth month of AD 24 Liu Xiu marched into Handan, and during the fifth month the city of Handan was conquered. Wang Lang escaped from Handan but was soon caught and killed.

Notes

1st-century BC births
24 deaths
Year of birth unknown
1st-century Chinese people
Ancient rebels
Chinese rebels